Opostegidae or "white eyecap moths" is a family of insects in the order Lepidoptera that is characterised by particularly large eyecaps over the compound eyes (see also Nepticulidae, Bucculatricidae, Lyonetiidae). Opostegidae are most diverse in the New World tropics (83 described species, representing 42% of the world total).

These small, whitish moths are probably miners in plant stems. Examples of host plants used in Europe are Lycopus, Mentha and Rumex, but their biology is poorly known. The subfamily Oposteginae comprises 87 described species and Opostegoidinae includes 15 described species.

References

External links

Watson, L., and Dallwitz, M.J. 2003 onwards. British insects: the families of Lepidoptera. Version: 29 December 2011 Detailed description and figures including wing venation.

 
Moth families
Taxa named by Edward Meyrick